Dreaming of Rita is a 1993 Swedish comedy film directed by Jon Lindström. Marika Lagercrantz was nominated for the award for Best Actress at the 29th Guldbagge Awards.

Cast
 Marika Lagercrantz as Rita
 Philip Zandén as Steff
 Yaba Holst as Sandra
 Adam Blänning as Adam
 Per Oscarsson as Bob
 Patrik Ersgård as Erik
 Lise Ringheim as Sabine
 Gert Fylking as Rolling
 Beryl Kornhill as Astrid

References

External links
 
 

1993 films
1993 comedy films
Swedish comedy films
1990s Swedish-language films
1990s Swedish films